Ross Blomfield  is a retired New Zealand rower. He won a bronze medal with the men's eight at the 1974 World Rowing Championships at Rotsee in Lucerne, Switzerland.

References

Year of birth missing (living people)
Living people
New Zealand male rowers
World Rowing Championships medalists for New Zealand